The 2002 Redditch Borough Council election of 2 May 2002 elected members of Redditch Borough Council in the West Midlands region, England. One third of the council stood for re-election and the Labour Party lost overall control of the council to no overall control for the first time in many years.

After the election, the council comprised:
Labour 14
Conservative 12
Liberal Democrat 3

Campaign

Before the election only a small swing would have seen the Labour party lose its majority on Redditch council, with the opposition Conservatives and Liberal Democrats only needing to pick up three seats between them for this to happen. The Labour Party was defending seven of the eleven seats to be decided and campaigned on its success over the previous years in eliminating all council debt. There was an extra seat in West ward where the Conservative leader on the council, Carol Grandy, stood down.

Election results

Labour lost its majority but remained the largest party. Labour had held control of the council for the previous 20 years but lost this after the other parties gained three seats in the election. Among Labour losses was its leader on the council, Albert Wharrad, who lost in Winyates ward to the Liberal Democrats. One of the closest results was in Lodge Park ward where Labour held on by 22 votes and Mohammed Nasir became the first Asian councillor on Redditch council. The results meant no party had a majority on the council for the first time in over 50 years, and the Conservative party claimed that the results would have been sufficient for them to have gained Redditch constituency in a general election. Turnout in the election was higher than in the last few years at 29.8%.

Following the election the Labour and Conservative parties on the council elected new leaders and attempted to gain Liberal Democrat support to control  the council. However the Liberal Democrats said that they would not form an agreement with either Labour or the Conservatives on their own. In the end at the council's annual general meeting on 15 May all parties joined the executive of the council, which was formed with four Labour, three Conservative and one Liberal Democrat members. The Conservatives had wanted an executive in which both they and Labour had the same number of seats and accused the Liberal Democrats of backing Labour to prevent this. The new Labour leader, David Cartwright, was elected leader of the council and retained the chairman's casting vote.

Ward results

References

2002
2002 English local elections
2000s in Worcestershire